Laura Tremosa Bonavia (born 1937, Espolla, Catalonia) is a Spanish industrial engineer and feminist. She studied mechanical engineering at the Polytechnic University of Catalonia in Barcelona, and earned her doctorate in the same field at the UPC in 1964. She was the first Catalan woman, and the second Spanish woman who qualified in industrial engineering.

Selected works
La robòtica a la indústria catalana (1989)
La Mujer ante el desafío tecnológico (1986)

References

1937 births
Living people
Spanish women engineers
Spanish feminists
Polytechnic University of Catalonia alumni
Spanish industrial engineers
Engineers from Catalonia
21st-century women engineers
20th-century women engineers
People from Alt Empordà